Muş is a city and the provincial capital of Muş Province in Turkey. Its population is mostly Kurds.

Etymology 
Various explanations of the origin of Muş's name exist. Its name is sometimes associated with the Armenian word mshush, meaning fog, explained by the fact that the town and the surrounding plain are frequently covered in fog in the mornings. The 17th-century explorer Evliya Çelebi relates a myth where a giant mouse created by Nemrud (Nimrod) destroys the city and its inhabitants, after which the city was named Muş (muš means "mouse" in Persian). Others have proposed a connection with the names of different ancient Anatolian peoples, the Mushki or the Mysians, or the toponyms Mushki and Mushuni mentioned in Assyrian and Hittite sources, respectively.

History

Ancient and medieval 
The date of foundation of Mush is unknown, although a settlement is believed to have been around by the time of Menua, the king of Urartu (c. 800 BC), whose cuneiform inscription was found in the city's vicinity. During the Middle Ages, Mush was the center of the Taron region of Armenia. It is first mentioned as a city in Armenian manuscripts of the 9th and 10th centuries. In the late 8th century Mush, along with the Taron region, came under control of the Armenian Bagratid (Bagratuni) dynasty, who reconquered it from the Arabs. Mush and the Taron region was captured and annexed to the Byzantine Empire in 969.

After the 11th century, the town was ruled by Islamic dynasties such as the Ahlatshahs, Ayyubids, Ilkhanids and Kara Koyunlu. In the 10th-13th centuries Mush developed into a major city with an estimated population of 20 to 25 thousand people. In 1387 the central Asian ruler Timur crossed the area and apparently captured Mush town without a battle. Later the Akkoyunlu ruled the area and in the 16th the Ottomans took control over the town and region in the 16th century from the Persian Safavids. Mush remained part of the Ottoman Empire till the early 20th century and during these times retained a large Armenian population. In 1821 a Persian invasion reached Mush.

Modern 

At the turn of the twentieth century, the city had around 20,000 inhabitants, of which 11,000 were Muslims, while 9,000 were Christian Armenians. According to the Catholic Encyclopedia (1913) the town had 27,000 inhabitants, of whom 13,300 were Muslims and 13,700 Armenians. According to the Encyclopædia Britannica (1911) the population was nearly equally divided between Kurds and Armenians.

During the Armenian genocide of 1915 the indigenous Armenian population of the region was exterminated. Over 140,000 Armenians of the Mush sanjak (living in 234 villages and towns) were targeted in June and July 1915. Military-aged Armenian men were conscripted to serve in World War I. The Armenian population was largely defenseless to these threats. The massacre of the Armenian population of the city of Mush came only after the surrounding villages were destroyed.

The town was captured during by the forces of the Russian Empire in February 1916 during the World War I.

Demographics 
Population of the municipality of Muş numbers 72,774 according to a 2009 estimate. Kurds make up the majority of the population. The rest are Arabs and Crypto-Armenians.

Main sights 
The area of Muş has several ruined castles. Under the rule of the medieval Armenian dynasties monasteries and churches were built in localities near Mush such as the Arakelots Monastery, Surp Marineh Church, Mush, Surb Karapet Monastery most of which are now ruins.

Under the rule of the Muslim dynasties, other type of buildings were built as well. There are mosques from the Ottoman and pre-Ottoman period which show influences of Seljuk architecture. Mosques like the Alaeddin Bey (18th century), Haci Seref (17th century), and Ulu Mosque (14th century). Caravanserais like the "Yıldızlı Han" (13th century) destroyed in 1916, the now almost completely ruined "Arslanli Han" and also bathhouse and fountain of Alaeddin Bey and tombs of Muslim saints.

Gallery

Notable locals 
 Armenak Shahmuradyan, Armenian operatic tenor
 Zafer Çağlayan, Turkish politician and former Minister
 Sabahattin Oğlago, four-time Olympian cross-country skier
 Zeki Eker, Turkish politician of Kurdish origin
 Kürşat Duymuş, Turkish football defender

Climate 
Muş has a humid continental climate (Köppen climate classification: Dsa, Trewartha climate classification: Dc) with cold, snowy winters and hot, very dry and very sunny summers.

References

Sources and external links 
 GCatholic - former and titular Armenian Catholic see
 Hundreds of pictures of the town
Bibliography
 
 

 
Populated places in Muş Province
Eastern Catholic titular sees
Former Armenian Catholic eparchies
Districts of Muş Province
Armenian genocide extermination centers
Kurdish settlements in Turkey